The Women's Auxiliary Corps (India) (WAC(I)) was created in March 1942, out of the Women's Auxiliary Service (Burma). By the end of the Second World War, it had recruited 11,500 women.

Personnel

Moina Imam, chief petty officer from Bihar, was among the first Indian girls to join the (WAC(I)) and became its poster girl.

Gallery

See also
Women in the Indian Armed Forces

References

Military units and formations established in 1942
Women in India
Women in the military by country